Duckeodendron is a genus of flowering plant in the family Solanaceae represented by a single species,  Duckeodendron cestroides. A tree reaching 15 to 30 m, it is found in the Amazon rainforest of Brazil. Its common names include pincel-de-macaco and pupunharana. João Geraldo Kuhlmann described it in 1925 and named it for the collector, Adolpho Ducke.

Taxonomy
It seems to be basal within Solanaceae and has not been assigned to any existing subfamily.

References

Monotypic Solanaceae genera
Trees of Brazil
Solanaceae